Highcliffe to Milford Cliffs is a  geological Site of Special Scientific Interest which stretches along the south coast of England from Christchurch  in Dorset to Milford on Seain Hampshire. It includes several Geological Conservation Review sites.

It exposes the fossil rich strata of the Barton Beds and Headon Beds, dating to the Eocene epoch around 40 million years ago, and is the type locality for many species of fauna and flora. The Barton Beds are capped by Pleistocene gravels which are rich in Paleolithic artefacts.

References

Sites of Special Scientific Interest in Hampshire
Sites of Special Scientific Interest in Dorset
Geological Conservation Review sites